Besides its most common meaning as the first letter of any word or name, an initial is a letter at the beginning of a written work, a chapter or a paragraph that is larger than the rest of the text and often decorative.

Initial may also refer to:
 Initial (linguistics), part of a syllable that precedes the syllable nucleus in phonetics and phonology
 Initial, an abbreviation for a person's given or middle name or both
 Rentokil Initial, a British business services group
 Initial Records, an American record label
 Initial (album), the debut album by the band Person L

See also

 Initialism